Further Adventures of is the eighth studio album by Canadian singer/songwriter Bruce Cockburn. The album was released in 1978 by True North Records. The title of the album is not "Further Adventures of Bruce Cockburn" and the original album cover the title is simply "Further Adventures of".  The album cover displays a picture of a small globe of the Earth after the title, implying that the adventures referred to are those of the planet Earth, not of Cockburn.

In 1996, alternative rock group Primitive Radio Gods had a hit with the song "Standing Outside a Broken Phone Booth with Money in My Hand", but that song is different from the song with nearly the same name on this album.

Reception

In a retrospective review, AllMusic critic Brett Hartenbach wrote, "though it may contain Bruce Cockburn's usual mix of beautifully intricate acoustic work and pastoral mysticism, along with the occasional touches of anger and irony, continues the growth that was so evident on his last studio outing In the Falling Dark... it serves as another steppingstone to what would be the most impressive period of his career..."

Track listing
All songs written by Bruce Cockburn.

 "Rainfall" – 3:48
 "A Montréal Song" – 4:06
 "Outside a Broken Phone Booth with Money In My Hand" – 4:53
 "Prenons La Mer" – 2:38
 "Red Ships Take Off In the Distance" – 5:15
 "Laughter" – 3:38
 "Bright Sky" – 4:01
 "Feast of Fools" – 6:42
 "Can I Go With You" – 2:30
 "Nanzen Ji" – 4:43

Album credits

Personnel
Bruce Cockburn – composer, vocals, guitar
Robert Boucher – bass guitar
Bob DiSalle – drums
Eugene Martynec – guitar
Kathryn Moses – flute
Beverly Glenn-Copeland – backing vocals on 1, 3, 6–7, and 9
Marty Nagler – backing vocals on 6 and 7
Tommy Graham – backing vocals on 6 and 7
Brent Titcomb – backing vocals on 6 and 7
Shingoore – backing vocals on 2 and 6–8
Ronney Abramson – backing vocals on 4

Production
Marcel Mousette – translation
Eugene Martynec – producer
Ken Friesen – engineer
Peter Holcomb – engineer's assistant
Bart Schoales – art direction
Fred Bird – model photograph
Bernie Finkelstein – direction

References

1978 albums
Bruce Cockburn albums
Albums produced by Gene Martynec
True North Records albums